In Greek mythology, Perses is the brother of Aeëtes, Aloeus, Circe and Pasiphaë, which makes him a son of Helios, the god of the sun, by Perse, an Oceanid nymph.

Etymology 
His name is derived from the Ancient Greek word perthō ( – "to sack", "to ravage", "to destroy").

Mythology 
Perses' brother Aeëtes had been warned by an oracle that great peril would come to him if the golden fleece was ever removed from Colchis. Indeed, after Medea helped Jason steal the fleece, Perses usurped the throne of Colchis from his brother, but was subsequently slain by Medea, his paternal niece, who restored her father to the throne,<ref>Pseudo-Apollodorus, Bibliotheca 1.9.28</ref> as an oracle had once predicted that he would be slain by his own kin.

One tale goes that after Perses seized power, Medea's son by either Aegeus or Jason, Medus, arrived in Colchis and was imprisoned immediately, though under a false identity. Soon after a famine broke out. Medea arrived in Colchis too, claiming to be a priestess of Artemis, and unknowingly, betrayed her son's true identity to Perses. Medea, under the pretext of simply wanting to talk to him, secretly gave Medus a sword, and explained what had happened to his grandfather Aeëtes. Medus then slew Perses.Diodorus Siculus, Historic Library 4.56.1

Although distinct from the Titan known as Perses, who is known for fathering Hecate, the goddess of witchcraft, Diodorus Siculus in his Bibliotheca historica made this Perses the father of Hecate by an unknown mother; Perses' brother Aeëtes then married Hecate and had Medea and Circe by her. Diodorus describes Perses as "exceedingly cruel" and "lawless".

 Genealogy 

 See also 

 Pelias
 Hamlet
 Scar

 Notes 

 References 
 Apollodorus, Apollodorus, The Library, with an English Translation by Sir James George Frazer, F.B.A., F.R.S. in 2 Volumes. Cambridge, MA, Harvard University Press; London, William Heinemann Ltd. 1921. Includes Frazer's notes.
 Diodorus Siculus, The Library of History translated by Charles Henry Oldfather. Twelve volumes. Loeb Classical Library. Cambridge, Massachusetts: Harvard University Press; London: William Heinemann, Ltd. 1989. Vol. 3. Books 4.59–8. Online version at Bill Thayer's Web Site 
 Diodorus Siculus, Bibliotheca Historica. Vol 1-2. Immanel Bekker. Ludwig Dindorf. Friedrich Vogel. in aedibus B. G. Teubneri. Leipzig. 1888-1890. Greek text available at the Perseus Digital Library.
 Hesiod, Theogony, in The Homeric Hymns and Homerica with an English Translation by Hugh G. Evelyn-White'', Cambridge, MA., Harvard University Press; London, William Heinemann Ltd. 1914. Online version at the Perseus Digital Library.
 Hyginus, Gaius Julius, The Myths of Hyginus. Edited and translated by Mary A. Grant, Lawrence: University of Kansas Press, 1960.

Mythological kings of Colchis
Kings in Greek mythology
Children of Helios
Demigods in classical mythology
Fictional people from Georgia (country)
Colchian characters in Greek mythology
Medea